Summerfield Historic District is a national historic district located at Summerfield, Guilford County, North Carolina.  The district encompasses 33 contributing buildings and 2 contributing structures in the crossroads village of Summerfield. Notable buildings include the Henry Clay Brittain Store (Summerfield Town Hall, c. 1870), the Ogburn Store (c. 1870s), the two-story double-pile Greek Revival style Alexander Strong Martin House (c. 1840), and the Queen Anne style Henry Clay Brittain House (c. 1903). It was listed on the National Register of Historic Places in 2005.

References

Buildings and structures in Guilford County, North Carolina
Greek Revival architecture in North Carolina
Historic districts on the National Register of Historic Places in North Carolina
National Register of Historic Places in Guilford County, North Carolina
Queen Anne architecture in North Carolina